Jacob Hermann may refer to:

 Jacob Hermann (mathematician), (1678–1733)
 Jacob Herrmann, German rugby union international
 Jacobus Arminius (1560–1609), Latinized name for Jacob Harmensz / Hermann

See also
 Jakob Hermann (1678–1733), Swiss mathematician 
 Jakob Herrmann (born 1987), Austrian ski mountaineer and paraglider pilot